The 2021 WAC women's basketball tournament was the postseason women's basketball tournament for the Western Athletic Conference during the 2020–21 season. All tournament games were played at the Orleans Arena in Paradise, Nevada, March 10–13, 2021. Cal Baptist won the tournament and would have received the WAC's automatic bid to the 2021 NCAA tournament, but, due to transition from Division II to Division I, are ineligible. The WAC automatic bid went to Utah Valley, who finished second in the regular season standings.

Seeds
Seven of the 9 teams in the WAC are eligible to compete in the conference tournament for NCAA postseason play. California Baptist is ineligible due to their transition from Division II to Division I, and Dixie State ended their season in January. Teams will be seeded by record within the conference.

Schedule and results

Bracket

References

External links
2021 Western Athletic Conference Men's and Women's Basketball Championships

WAC women's basketball tournament
2020–21 Western Athletic Conference women's basketball season
2021 in sports in Nevada
Basketball competitions in the Las Vegas Valley
College basketball tournaments in Nevada
Women's sports in Nevada
College sports tournaments in Nevada